Breaking the Habit or breaking the habit may refer to:

 Drug rehabilitation techniques, such as:
 Smoking cessation
 going cold turkey
 Breaking the Habit (film), a 1964 animated short film by John Korty, nominated at 37th Academy Awards
 "Breaking the Habit" (song), single by Linkin Park